The rufous-naped greenlet (Pachysylvia semibrunnea) is a species of bird in the family Vireonidae. It is found in the Andes in Colombia, northern Ecuador, and westernmost Venezuela. Its natural habitats are subtropical or tropical moist montane forests and heavily degraded former forest.

References

rufous-naped greenlet
Birds of the Colombian Andes
Birds of the Ecuadorian Andes
rufous-naped greenlet
Taxonomy articles created by Polbot